Kees Akerboom Jr. (born 20 December 1983)  is a retired Dutch basketball player. Kees is the son of Kees Akerboom Sr., a former successful professional basketball player as well. During the majority of his career, Akerboom played with Den Bosch, which he won three DBL championships with. He also played for the Netherlands national basketball team during his career.

Professional career
Akerboom started his professional career with the same team as his father did, EiffelTowers Den Bosch in the  Dutch Eredivisie.

On 29 May 2004, Akerboom signed with MPC Capitals from Groningen.

After two seasons with the Capitals, Akerboom returned to EiffelTowers. He won his first Dutch championship in 2007. He won his second in 2012, after beating ZZ Leiden 4–1 in the Finals. In 2015, Akerboom won his third championship after beating Donar 4–1 in the Finals.

On 31 May 2018, Akerboom announced his retirement at age 34. He set a new all-time record for games played for Den Bosch, with 671 games. His jersey number 12 was retired by Den Bosch.

International career
Akerboom played 99 games for the Netherlands national basketball team over twelve years. He was a member of the team playing at EuroBasket 2015. On 5 July 2016, Akerboom's retirement from the Dutch national team was announced.

International statistics

|-
| style="text-align:left;"| 2015 EuroBasket
| style="text-align:left;"| 
| 5 || – || 17.5 || .304 || .333 || .750 || 1.2 || .2 || – || – || 4.4

Honours

Club
Den Bosch
Dutch Basketball League: 2006–07, 2011–12, 2014–15
NBB Cup: 2007–08, 2008–09, 2012–13
Dutch Supercup: 2013

Individual
DBL All-Star (11): 2004, 2006, 2008, 2009, 2010, 2011, 2012, 2014, 2015, 2016, 2017
DBL All-First Team: 2010–11
DBL Rookie of the Year: 2002–03
DBL MVP Under 23: 2003–04
DBL Three points percentage leader: 2007–08, 2008–09, 2010–11, 2011–12
DBL All Star Game: 3 Point Contest Winner: 2008, 2009
DBL All-Star Game MVP: 2010

References

1983 births
Living people
Donar (basketball club) players
Dutch Basketball League players
Dutch men's basketball players
People from Sint-Michielsgestel
Small forwards
Heroes Den Bosch players
Sportspeople from North Brabant